The Librarians (also known as Strike Force) is a 2003 action thriller film directed by Mike Kirton. The film stars William Forsythe, Andrew Divoff, Erika Eleniak, and Christopher Atkins.

Plot summary
Sandi Clark (Erika Eleniak) goes underground in Miami to search for her sister, Amanda Clark, who has gone missing after running away from home. Sandi gets a job in the strip club where her sister was last seen and this brings her face-to-face with a local crime syndicate's leader (Andrew Divoff). She discovers he was involved, but can't find any evidence. In the meantime Sandi's father (Michael Parks) hires a group of mercenaries called The Librarians, Simon (William Forsythe), Toshko (Daniel Bernhardt), and G-Man (Amaury Nolasco), to find his missing daughter. With the help of his old friend Irish (Burt Reynolds), Simon runs into Sandi at the strip club and together they try to find Amanda. As Sandi and Simon get closer to the truth and each other, the danger and the heat will rise!

Cast
 William Forsythe as Simon
 Andrew Divoff as Marcos
 Erika Eleniak as Sandi Clark
 Christopher Atkins as Ringo
 Daniel Bernhardt as Toshko
 Rebecca Forsythe as Megan
 Burt Reynolds as 'Irish' (uncredited)
 Matthias Hues as Ciro
 Amaury Nolasco as 'G-Man'
 Ed Lauter as John Strong
 Michael Parks as William Clark

Production
Shooting took place in Palm Beach County, Florida.  Local schoolchildren worked on the set as interns, recruited from an educational program begun by producer Greg Hauptner.

Release
The film was originally released as The Librarians in 2001.  Lionsgate released it in the US in 2003 as Strike Force.

Reception
David Johnson of DVD Verdict wrote, "Suffice it to say, Strike Force is every bit as stupid and forgettable as its insipid title suggests."

References

External links
 
 

2003 films
2003 action films
American action films
American vigilante films
Films set in Miami
Films shot in Florida
2000s vigilante films
2000s English-language films
2000s American films